Nicanor González del Solar (born December 24, 1943) is an Argentine sports journalist and former rugby union player. He was part of the Argentina national team than toured on South Africa in 1965 achieving a historic victory over the Junior Springboaks.

Career 
González del Solar began his career playing for Club Atlético San Isidro, club where he played throughout his career.

Del Solar played his first test match for the national team against Uruguay, during the 1964 South American Rugby Championship. He won the South American title, when playing the last match against Chile. On August 22, 1964, in the city of São Paulo, Argentina beat Chile by 30-0.

The biggest game of his life was against South Africa, on July 19, 1965, in the Ellis Park Stadium, the Argentine team had played against Springboks, in the historic victory of Argentina by 11-6.

Nicanor González del Solar was the first journalist to report on rugby match from the outside of Argentina. He covered all world rugby championships, the Barcelona Olympics, Atlanta, Sydney, Athens. And the Pan American Games of 1995. 1999 and 2007.

Titles

Club
C.A. San Isidro
 Torneo de la URBA (3): 1962, 1964, 1967

National team
Argentina
 South American Rugby Championship (1): 1964

References

External links 
www.portalunoargentina.com.ar

Argentina international rugby union players
Argentine rugby union players
Rugby union players from Buenos Aires
Rugby union journalists
Argentine sports journalists
1943 births
Living people
Argentine people of Spanish descent
Rugby union hookers